Sweden competed at the 1984 Winter Olympics in Sarajevo, Yugoslavia.

Medalists

Alpine skiing

Men

Ingemar Stenmark, a double gold medalist in 1980, was banned from these Olympics by the International Ski Federation (FIS) for accepting promotional payments directly, rather than through the Swedish ski federation.

Biathlon

Men

Men's 4 x 7.5 km relay

 1 A penalty loop of 150 metres had to be skied per missed target.
 2 One minute added per missed target.

Bobsleigh

Cross-country skiing

Men

Men's 4 × 10 km relay

Women

Women's 4 × 5 km relay

Figure skating

Men

Women

Ice hockey

Summary

Group A
Top two teams (shaded ones) advanced to the medal round.

Sweden 11-3 Italy
Sweden 11-0 Yugoslavia
Sweden 1-1 West Germany
Sweden 10-1 Poland
USSR 10-1 Sweden

Medal round

Czechoslovakia 2-0 Sweden
Sweden 2-0 Canada

Carried over group match:
USSR 10-1 Sweden

Leading scorers

Team roster
Rolf Ridderwall
Göte Wälitalo
Bo Ericson
Göran Lindblom
Håkan Nordin
Mats Thelin
Michael Thelvén
Mats Waltin
Thomas Åhlén
Pelle Eklund
Thom Eklund
Håkan Eriksson
Peter Gradin
Mats Hessel
Michael Hjälm
Tommy Mörth
Thomas Rundqvist
Tomas Sandström
Håkan Södergren
Jens Öhling
Head coach: Anders Parmström

Luge

Men

Women

Speed skating

Men

Women

References

External links
 Olympic Winter Games 1984, full results by sports-reference.com

Nations at the 1984 Winter Olympics
1984
Winter Olympics